Northwestern College can refer to:
Northwestern College (Illinois) in Bridgeview, Illinois
Northwestern College (Iowa) in Orange City, Iowa
The former Northwestern College (Minnesota) in Roseville, Minnesota, now known as University of Northwestern – St. Paul
The former Northwestern College (Wisconsin) in Watertown, Wisconsin, which was incorporated into Martin Luther College in New Ulm, Minnesota, in 1995.
The former Northwestern College (Fergus Falls, Minnesota), which closed in 1932.
Northwest Louisiana Technical College, Minden, Louisiana
Northwestern Michigan College, Traverse City, Michigan

See also
Northwest College, Powell, Wyoming, USA
Northwestern University (disambiguation)
Northwest University (disambiguation)